Profronde van Almelo is an elite men's and women's professional road bicycle racing event held annually in Almelo, Netherlands. The first edition was in 1983 and since 2008 the event also includes a women's race. In 1987 and 1988 the race was a stage within the Ronde van Nederland, a UCI category 2.1 event.

Honours

Men's 

Source

Women's 

Source

References

External links
 

Women's road bicycle races
Recurring sporting events established in 1983
1983 establishments in the Netherlands
Men's road bicycle races
Cycling in Overijssel
Sport in Almelo